Djupa Skogen ("Deep Forest") is the Swedish punk group Dia Psalma's fourth studio album, the first one to be released after they reunited in 2006. It featured eleven brand new tracks as well as a remake of their song "Öga för öga". The only single of the album was "Som Man Är" ("As You Are").

Track listing
 Norrsken
 Lösningen
 Blod
 Spelet helvetet
 Här & nu
 Barn av eran tid
 Som man är
 Saknaden
 Precis
 Mitt Fönster
 Öga för öga
 Historien

Chart positions

References

2007 albums
Dia Psalma albums